Medaura  is an Asian genus of stick insects in the family Phasmatidae, subfamily Clitumninae and tribe Medaurini.  Species have a known distribution from tropical Asia, including Indo-China.

Species 
Medaura includes the following species:
 Medaura austeni (Wood-Mason, 1875)
 Medaura jobrensis Brock & Cliquennois, 2001
 Medaura lagerstroemia Thanasinchayakul, 2006
 Medaura makassarinus (Westwood, 1859)
 Medaura scabriuscula (Wood-Mason, 1873) - type species (as Stheneboea brunneri Stål)

References

External links

Phasmatodea genera
Phasmatodea of Asia
Phasmatidae